Alex A. "Big Alex" Torrance (born c. 1936) is a Scottish curler.

Torrance and the entirety of his 1964 Scottish champion rink were farmers from Hamilton. Torrance is the cousin of his skip on that team, also named Alex.

Teams

References

External links
 

Living people
1930s births
Scottish male curlers
Scottish curling champions
Sportspeople from Hamilton, South Lanarkshire
Scottish farmers